The Gem County Courthouse, located at the intersection of Main St. and McKinley Ave. in Emmett, is the county courthouse serving Gem County, Idaho. The courthouse was built in 1938 to give the small county a government building, as it had been without one since the previous courthouse burned in 1920. Architect Frank Hummel of Tourtellotte and Hummel designed the Art Deco building. The two-and-one-half story concrete building features a projecting three-story entrance with fluted columns and cross vents on either side of the doorway. Each side of the front facade features four sets of windows separated by fluted pilasters.

The courthouse was added to the National Register of Historic Places on November 17, 1982.

References

Courthouses on the National Register of Historic Places in Idaho
Art Deco architecture in Idaho
Government buildings completed in 1938
Buildings and structures in Gem County, Idaho
County courthouses in Idaho
National Register of Historic Places in Gem County, Idaho